Brushy Creek is a stream in Carter and 
Wayne counties in the U.S. state of Missouri. It is a tributary of the Black River.

Brushy Creek was so named on account of brush near its course.

See also
List of rivers of Missouri

References

Rivers of Carter County, Missouri
Rivers of Wayne County, Missouri
Rivers of Missouri